Makita Engineering Germany GmbH (Dolmar) is one of the oldest manufacturers of portable gasoline chainsaws and is headquartered in Hamburg, Germany. It was tested on Mount Dolmar in the Thüringer forest and the company took its name from the test site.

In 1991 the company was acquired by Japanese tool manufacturer Makita.

References

External links

 

German brands
Chainsaws
Logging
Garden tool manufacturers
Manufacturing companies based in Hamburg
Power tool manufacturers
Lawn and garden tractors
Tool manufacturing companies of Germany